Cadherin-16 is a protein that in humans is encoded by the CDH16 gene.

This gene is a member of the cadherin superfamily, genes encoding calcium-dependent, membrane-associated glycoproteins. Mapped to a previously identified cluster of cadherin genes on chromosome 16q22.1, the gene localizes with superfamily members CDH1, CDH3, CDH5, CDH8 and CDH11. The protein consists of an extracellular domain containing 6 cadherin domains, a transmembrane region and a truncated cytoplasmic domain but lacks the prosequence and tripeptide HAV adhesion recognition sequence typical of most classical cadherins. Expression is exclusively in the kidney, where the protein functions as the principal mediator of homotypic cellular recognition, playing a role in the morphogenic direction of tissue development.

References

Further reading

External links